The Lake County Courthouse and Sheriff's Residence, located at 601 3rd Avenue in Two Harbors, Lake County in the U.S. state of Minnesota was built in 1906. In 1888 a two-story brick sheriff's residence and jail was erected with an adjacent Queen Anne style courthouse. A 1904 fire destroyed the courthouse, but the jail and residence remained.  The replacement building, designed in the Beaux Arts style by James Allen MacLeod, was built of brick and limestone, featuring quoin blocks, stone window surrounds with large keystones, dentil moulding, and four large columns supporting the entry overhang. The courtroom was topped with an open semi-circular dome covered with metallic scaled shakes. In 1945, the dome was enclosed from below. Axel Edward Soderberg was commissioned to paint murals depicting "Law and Justice", commerce, mining, and logging, at a cost of $1,500 in 1905. The jail and residence building were razed in the 1990s.

References

Beaux-Arts architecture in Minnesota
Houses in Lake County, Minnesota
County courthouses in Minnesota
County government buildings in Minnesota
Courthouses on the National Register of Historic Places in Minnesota
Government buildings completed in 1906
Houses on the National Register of Historic Places in Minnesota
National Register of Historic Places in Lake County, Minnesota
1906 establishments in Michigan